Kirkland is an on-island suburb on the Island of Montreal in southwestern Quebec, Canada. It is named after Charles-Aimé Kirkland, a Quebec provincial politician. It was incorporated as a town in 1961.

Kirkland is primarily a residential community, with a commercial core, and an industrial park straddling the Trans-Canada Highway (Autoroute 40). In 1997, that portion of the Autoroute 40 was renamed to Félix-Leclerc Highway. The city is composed of mainly single-family residences, with some multi-unit facilities (apartments, town houses, and condos) available.

History

In the early 18th century settlement began of farming communities along Côte Saint-Charles (now Boulevard Saint-Charles). By 1731, Côte Saint-Charles had 19 farms, 12 houses, and 17 barns. It was part of the Parish of Saint-Joachim de la Pointe Claire, which included the present territory of the cities of Beaconsfield, Kirkland, and Pointe-Claire. The construction of the Grand Trunk Railway in 1855 brought further development.

In 1845, the Municipality of Pointe-Claire was created, abolished two years later and restored in 1855 as the Parish Municipality of Saint-Joachim-de-la-Pointe-Claire (or just Pointe-Claire). In 1910, Beaconsfield split off to form a separate town. In 1955, large portions of the parish municipality were annexed by the City of Pointe-Claire (originally the Village Municipality of Saint-Joachim-de-la-Pointe-Claire) and by the Parish of Sainte-Geneviève. Attempts in the late 1950s by the City of Beaconsfield to annex the municipality started the process to become a town.

That same year, the construction began of the Trans-Canada Highway (Autoroute 40), completed in 1964.

On January 1, 2002, as part of the 2002–2006 municipal reorganization of Montreal, it was merged into the city of Montreal and became a borough.  However, after a change of government and a 2004 referendum, it was re-constituted as an independent municipality on January 1, 2006.

Demographics 

Economy

The town of Kirkland has a large business and industrial park spanning both sides of Quebec Autoroute 40. Companies in the area operate in a wide range of industries including aerospace, electronic goods, pharmaceuticals, printed goods, renewable energy, software engineering, telecommunications, petrochemicals, and transportation.

Notable employers in the city of Kirkland include:
 Broccolini Construction
 Jubilant DraxImage
 Merck & Co.
 Nissan
 Pfizer
 Targray
 Zodiac Aerospace
Zoetis

Local government

The territory of the Town of Kirkland is divided into eight electoral districts. Each district is represented by a councillor elected by the voters of that district. The mayor is elected by all voters and represents the entire territory made up of eight-districts.

It is a full-service community, with a public works department, recreation department, engineering department, accounting, communications, human resources and administrative services operating for the welfare of its citizens.

The present mayor is now Michel Gibson, who has been a member of the Kirkland City Council since the mid-1970s.

Michael Brown (District 1 - Timberlea)
Luciano Piciacchia (District 2 - Holleuffer)
Samuel Rother (District 3 - Brunswick)
Domenico Zito (District 4 - Lacey Green West)
Stephen Bouchard (District 5 - Lacey Green East)
John Morson (District 6 - Canvin)
Paul Dufort (District 7 - St. Charles)
André Allard (District 8 - Summerhill)

Former mayors
List of former mayors:

 Jean-Baptiste Théoret (1845–1847)
 Francois Valois (1855–1858, 1864–1868)
 Gabriël Valois (1858–1860, 1869–71, 1881–1887)
 Pierre Charles Valois (1860–1864)
 Leon Legault (1864, 1872–1881)
 Joste Legaut (1887–1895)
 Jean Bte Valérie Quesnel (1896–1909)
 Gédéon Legault (1910–1914)
 Daniel Arthur Legault (1915–1918)
 Joseph Dosithée Legault (1919–1925)
 Ernest Brunet (1925–1927)
 Joseph Anthime Legault (1927–1931)
 Ovila Brunet (1931–1939)
 Joseph Glaude Zetique Asénor Legault (1939–1941)
 Aimé Legault (1941–1945)
 Edmé Brunet (1945–1953)
 André Brunet (1953–1957, 1965–1968)
 W. Wallace Horne (1957–1958)
 James A. Smiley (1958, 1968–1975)
 Marcel Meloche (1958–1965)
 Samuel L. Elkas (1975–1989)
 John William Meaney (1989, 1994–2002, 2006–2013)
 Nunzio "Nick" Discepola (1989–1993)
 Michel Gibson (1993–1994, 2013–present)
 Brian MacDonald (1994)

Culture and recreation

Public Library 
The Kirkland Public Library has an impressive collective of more than 80,000 volumes in French and English for adults, teens and children. The library also offers online database searching, children and adult programs, computer rooms, wireless Internet, inter-library loans, photocopying and reserved books.

Parks, Green space and Sport facilities 
Kirkland Sports Complex has an indoor gymnasium that offers badminton, basketball, floor hockey, volleyball and other indoor sport activities. As well as an arena for hockey, ringette, free or figure skating.

Around the town there are multiple outdoor centres for soccer, baseball, tennis, football, basketball, beach volleyball and ice rinks as well as a 5 kilometre bike trail. There is also a splash pad and community pool offered in this town. The splash pad and community pools make it possible for young and old alike to experience the joys of swimming. The splash pad is located the Harris park. The community pool is located at the Ecclestone park.

The Town of Kirkland has many halls and park chalets, which citizens, associations and organizations can rent out for different occasions or activities (banquets, meetings, parties, exhibits, shows, etc.):

 Sports Complex
 Ecclestone Chalet
 Holleuffer Chalet
 Kirkland Chalet
 Lantier House
 Conference room (Kirkland Public Library)
 Dés Bénévoles Chalet
Meades Park (on the same grounds as the sports complex)
Canvin Park
Kirkland Park
Robbie-Loftus Park
Park du Chablis
Park Syrah 
Park Moreau
Park Fewtrell
Park Dance
Park Letarte

Special Events 
Kirkland Day, which takes place mid-June, is a big outdoor annual festival celebrating the inauguration of the Town of Kirkland on March 24, 1961. The first Kirkland Day was held on June 20, 1970 at the dedication of Kirkland Park. Since then, Kirkland residents come out in great numbers every year to celebrate the town together.

Other events within the town include:
 Winter Carnival
Kirkland Day
 Mini Olympics
 Kirkland Food Drive
 Christmas Events

Education
The Centre de services scolaire Marguerite-Bourgeoys operates Francophone public schools, but were previously operated by the Commission scolaire Marguerite-Bourgeoys until June 15, 2020. The change was a result of a law passed by the Quebec government that changed the school board system from denominational to linguistic.

Professional development centres:
 Centre de formation professionnelle des métiers de la santé

Primary schools:
 École primaire Émile-Nelligan

The Lester B. Pearson School Board (LBPSB) operates Anglophone public schools in the area.

Primary schools:
 Margaret Manson Elementary School
 Some areas are served by Sherbrooke Academy (junior and senior campuses) and Beacon Hill Elementary School in Beaconsfield, Clearpoint Elementary School in Pointe-Claire, and Kingsdale Academy in Pierrefonds-Roxboro

The Quebec Ministry of Education, Recreation and Sports operates:

Preschool, primary and high school:
 Kuper Academy
The Federation of private schools, FEEP (La Féderation des establissements d'enseginement privés) operates bilingual (French/English) private schools in the area:

Preschool and primary school:
 Académie Marie-Claire

Notable residents

Nick Discepola, former mayor, former Member of Parliament for Vaudreuil-Soulanges
Tanith Belbin, Canadian-American ice dancer
Joseph Veleno, hockey player
Louis Leblanc, hockey player
Randy McKay, hockey player
Thomas Gale, hockey player
Brandon Reid, hockey player
Sergio Momesso, hockey player
 Marc Denis, radio personality
Charles Daudelin, artist, pioneer in integrating art in public
Michael Regina, co-founder of TheOneRing.net

See also
 List of former boroughs
 2002–2006 municipal reorganization of Montreal
 2000–2006 municipal reorganization in Quebec

References

External links

 Kirkland website

 
Cities and towns in Quebec
Island of Montreal municipalities